Nucleolar protein of 40 kDa is a protein that in humans is encoded by the ZCCHC17 gene.

See also
 Complementary DNA (cDNA)
 Ribonucleoprotein
 RNA-binding protein
 Zinc finger

References

Further reading